A Winnie the Pooh Thanksgiving is a 1998 made-for-TV special featuring the voice talents of Jim Cummings, Paul Winchell, and John Fiedler. The special shows Pooh and his friends learning the true meaning of Thanksgiving. It was nominated for Primetime Emmy for Outstanding Children's Program.

Plot
It's Thanksgiving in the Hundred Acre Wood and Winnie the Pooh and his friends bring food for the feast. Pooh brings honey, Piglet brings acorns, Gopher brings lemonade, Owl brings biscuits, Eeyore brings thistles, and Tigger brings ice cream. But Rabbit tells them that they need a real feast with turkey, cranberry sauce, and pumpkin pie and sends them on a scavenger hunt to get them (Eeyore and Tigger to pick the cranberries, Gopher to gather pumpkins for the pie, and Pooh and Piglet to get the turkey).

Cast
 Jim Cummings as Winnie the Pooh / Tigger (singing voice)
 John Fiedler as Piglet (speaking voice)
 Steve Schatzberg as Piglet (singing voice)
 Paul Winchell as Tigger (speaking voice)
 Peter Cullen as Eeyore (voice)
 Ken Sansom as Rabbit (voice)
 Andre Stojka as Owl (voice)
 Michael Gough as Gopher (voice)
 Brady Bluhm as Christopher Robin (voice)
 Frankie J. Galasso as Christopher Robin (singing voice)
 David Warner as Narrator (voice)

Broadcast
The special originally aired Thanksgiving Day 1998 at 8 pm on ABC. It reaired every year on Thanksgiving until 2003. According to TVTango.com's ratings database, the first airing brought in a 3.8 household Nielsen rating.

Home video
The video has not been released by itself, with the exception of specially released tapes that were given to members of the Academy of Television Arts & Sciences for that year's show. It was released as part of the VHS cassette Winnie the Pooh: Seasons of Giving with the narrator's lines were redubbed by Laurie Main, and the ending scene was shortened down, along with select episodes of The New Adventures of Winnie the Pooh in 1999.

References

External links

1998 in American television
1998 television specials
Short films with live action and animation
Thanksgiving television specials
Winnie-the-Pooh specials
Winnie-the-Pooh television series
Winnie the Pooh (franchise)
Television specials by Disney Television Animation
1998 films
Films directed by Jun Falkenstein
1990s American films